The Hello Kitty murder case took place in Hong Kong in the spring of 1999, when a nightclub hostess was abducted in Citrus Road, Lai Yiu Estate and tortured in an apartment in Tsim Sha Tsui after stealing a wallet owned by one of her frequent customers. Fan Man-yee (23) was held captive by three men and one girl before dying between April 14 to April 15, 1999. Her body was decapitated and her skull placed inside of a Hello Kitty plush, which gave the name for the murder case.

Background 

Born in 1975, Fan Man-yee was abandoned by her family as a child, resulting in her being raised in an all girls' orphanage. When she turned 15, she was told to leave the orphanage because they had an age restriction. Becoming homeless and addicted to drugs, Fan was forced into street prostitution until the age of 21, when she began working at a brothel. Fan eventually married one of her clients, a fellow drug addict named Ng Chi-yuen, in 1996. She gave birth to their son two years later in approximately November 1998, not long before her murder. Fan's husband was described as abusive and neighbors would report being woken-up by sounds of the couple's fights and the child's screaming and crying from their apartment. Upon the pregnancy and then birth of her son, Fan decided to turn her life around in order to protect her son and provide him a safer life. She quit drugs and prostitution, got a job as a hostess at a brothel, and eventually left her violent husband shortly before her murder. Due to these sacrifices, she had a much lower income and struggled to support herself and her family.

Kidnapping 
Chan Man-lok, a 34-year-old Wo Shing Wo triad member who had previous charges for drug trafficking, was one of Fan's regular clients at the brothel. In early 1999, Fan stole Chan's wallet, which contained about $HK4,000 (roughly US$500). When Chan realized what had happened, he demanded Fan return the money in addition to a fee of $HK10,000. Although Fan immediately returned the stolen money, she needed more time to secure the additional fee.

On March 17, 1999, Fan was abducted by three men and one girl at her HDB flat in Block 90 Citrus Road (柑橘路), Fu Yiu section of Lai Yiu Estate: Chan; his grooming victim Lau Ming-fong (pseudonym Ah Fong, 14), Leung Wai-lun (21), and Leung Shing-cho. The group took Fan to an apartment at No. 31 Granville Road, Tsim Sha Tsui, where they imprisoned her for a month. Initially, Chan had intended to make money off of Fan by pimping her out to other men.

Ordeal 
During her imprisonment, she was tortured and raped. According to one source, she was beaten with metal bars, sometimes while being strung up and used as a punching bag. On one occasion, Fan was kicked in the head around fifty times. Spices were rubbed into Fan's wounds, her legs and feet were burned with candle wax and hot plastic so that she was unable to walk, she was forced to consume human feces and urine, and she was forced to smile and say she enjoyed the beatings; if she refused, they subjected her to even harsher torture. This treatment eventually led to traumatic shock and ultimately death.

Fan succumbed to her wounds between April 14 or April 15, 1999. Some sources claim that she died while her captors were out, while others say she died overnight. Upon returning Fan's body, her captors dismembered and boiled the remains; her skull was sewed inside of a Hello Kitty doll while the rest of the body was discarded. Only her skull, one tooth, and some internal organs were recovered in a plastic bag, after Lau led the Yau Ma Tei police to the scene on May 24. At the time of the arrest, Chan was living with his wife Ah Pui (real name Tse Pui-ling) and his newborn baby at an apartment in Block 72 Mau Wai Road in the Shek Ning section of Shek Lei Estate. Tse was first suspected to be involved in the murder, but was quickly released after no evidence was found. After finding out the murder made it to the media, Leung Wai-lun escaped to mainland China before getting caught by the police on February 14, 2000.

Trial
On December 7, 2000, after a trial which lasted over six weeks, the three men were convicted of manslaughter, as the jury ruled the remains were not sufficient to show whether Fan was murdered or died from a drug overdose. While the jury could not rule that the men intended to kill Fan, they did determine that she had died as a result of their abuse. Lau testified at the trial in exchange for immunity.

Justice Peter Nguyen, who sentenced the trio to
life in prison with the possibility of parole, stated, "Never in Hong Kong in recent years has a court heard of such cruelty, depravity, callousness, brutality, violence, and viciousness." Psychiatric reports described the three as "remorseless". There would be no review for parole for twenty years, i.e. until 2020. Chan Man-lok and Leung Wai-lun are currently serving their life sentences in Stanley Prison.

Aftermath
Fan's skull was the only exhibit in the case. After the trial, it was kept by the forensic pathologist in the Kowloon Public Mortuary until the appeal process of the prisoners was completed, and her birth family was notified in March 2004 that the skull would be returned and cremated on March 26. 

The apartment building in which the crime took place was demolished in September 2012 and has been rebuilt as a hotel named Soravit in 2016. Three buddha portraits were placed in the hotel as a memorial.

The publicity around the case resulted in the production and release of films that told the story. Both Human Pork Chop (烹屍之喪盡天良) and There is a Secret in my Soup were released in 2001.

Leung Shing-cho, who managed to reduce his sentence from life to eighteen years on appeal, was released in April 2014. Eight years later, Leung was arrested and sentenced to jail once again for 12 months in August 2022 for sexually assaulting a 10-year-old girl.

See also
Eight Immortals Restaurant murders
Murder of Junko Furuta 
Murder of Abby Choi

References

Notes

External links

 Trio sentenced to life in jail for gruesome killing in H.K – Asian Economic News, 11 December 2000

People murdered in Hong Kong
1999 crimes in Hong Kong
1999 murders in China
Hello Kitty
Kidnappings in Hong Kong
Murder in Hong Kong
1990s murders in Hong Kong
Triad (organized crime)
People murdered by organized crime
Incidents of violence against women
Violence against women in Hong Kong
Female murder victims
History of women in Hong Kong